Mrákotín is name of several locations in the Czech Republic:

Mrákotín (Chrudim District), a municipality and village in the Pardubice Region
Mrákotín (Jihlava District), a market town in the Vysočina Region